Jamilabad (also Romanized as Jamīlābād) is a village in Fathabad Rural District, in the Central District of Baft County, Kerman Province, Iran. At the 2006 census, its population was 304, in 67 families.

References 

Populated places in Baft County